Lago di Aviasco is an artificial lake above Valgoglio in the Province of Bergamo, Lombardy, Italy.

References 
Diga Lago Aviasco 

Lakes of Lombardy